The Music of Nebraska has included a variety of country, jazz, blues, ragtime, rock and alternative rock musicians. Several towns across the state have active musical venues, with several communities having a particularly important musical legacy.

Omaha

Bands on Saddle Creek Records in Omaha, such as Bright Eyes, The Faint, and Cursive, are playing a significant role in the national rock scene. The formation of the sound occurred in the mid-1990s with Commander Venus, Frontier Trust, Weak, and Matchbook Shannon, and clubs such as the Cog Factory, and Sokol Music Hall. Many people involved in these bands and venues are currently involved with Saddle Creek.

Other related aspects of the Omaha sound include various alternative bands.  The alternative music scene has produced such popular artists as 311, Beaver & the Hottage Cutch, Betsy Wells and Grasshopper Takeover, and Omaha has been a temporary home base of Midwest bands such as Tilly and the Wall, Rilo Kiley, The Urge, Pomeroy, and Blue October. Tim McMahan's Lazy-i and SLAMOmaha.com are the main media outlets promoting Saddle Creek and other Omaha bands.

In Omaha, a mainstay of the music scene is Nils Anders Erickson. The studio houses modern equipment and has recorded with artists with local connections such as 311, but what makes the studio famous is its collection of vintage equipment. On top of the studio, Nils heads local jam band Paddy O'Furniture. Other mainstays of the music scene in Omaha include folk artists such as Simon Joyner, Kyle Knapp, and his son, Saddle Creek artist Joe Knapp, Joe Watson, Mike Murphy, Kevin Quinn, and electronic artists Peter None and Chip Davis.

Notable jazz musicians include jazz guitarist Dave Stryker and drummer Victor Lewis.

Omaha also has many heavier acts as well. In the mid to late 1990s the bands Secret Skin, Clever, and Twitch dominated the scene with their highly rhythmic and guitar-driven sound.  Since the turn of the millennium, it has been a strong spot for Metalcore bands. A good amount have gone on to be National acts, such as Analog, Paria, System Failure, and I Am Legend. Also, the Power Metal band Cellador hails from Omaha. It also draws many other heavy musical acts, strongly of the Screamo genre, including Eyes of Verotika, Caught in the Fall, and Robots Don't Cry. Other notable groups include Noah's Ark was a Spaceship, Back When, and Father.

The 2000s saw the rise in popularity of Saddle Creek Records. The label went on to build a music venue called Slowdown, encouraging more bands to stop in Omaha rather than skipping to the heralded music scene of Lawrence, Kansas. The Waiting Room also opened in March 2007.

For over a decade Terry O'Halloran and the Omaha Blues Society have brought world class blues to Omaha.  Within the past five years Omaha has grown to love local favorites Satchel Grande, Kris Lager Band, and Funk Trek.  Their predecessors Electric Soul Method and Polydypsia helped set the stage for this music to grow in Omaha.

North Omaha

From the 1920s through the early 1960s North Omaha boasted a vibrant entertainment district featuring African American music. The main artery of North 24th Street was the heart of the city's African-American cultural and business community with a thriving jazz and rhythm and blues scene that attracted top-flight swing, blues and jazz bands from across the country.

The most important venue was the storied Dreamland Ballroom, which was opened in the Jewell Building in 1923 at 24th and Grant Streets in the Near North Side neighborhood. Dreamland hosted some of the greatest jazz, blues, and swing performers, including Duke Ellington, Count Basie, Louis Armstrong, Lionel Hampton, and the original Nat King Cole Trio. Whitney Young spoke there as well. Other venues included Jim Bell's Harlem, opened in 1935 on Lake Street, west of 24th; McGill's Blue Room, located at 24th and Lake, and Allen's Showcase Lounge, which was located at 24th and Lake. Due to racial segregation, musicians such as Cab Calloway stayed at Myrtle Washington's at 22nd and Willis while others stayed at Charlie Trimble's at 22nd and Seward. The intersection of 24th and Lake was the setting of the Big Joe Williams song "Omaha Blues".

Notable North Omaha musicians

Blues singer Wynonie Harris was born and raised in Omaha. Early North Omaha bands included Lewis' Excelsior Brass Band, Dan Desdunes Band, Simon Harrold's Melody Boys, the Sam Turner Orchestra, the Ted Adams Orchestra, the Omaha Night Owls, Red Perkins and His Original Dixie Ramblers, and the Lloyd Hunter Band who became the first Omaha band to record in 1931. A Lloyd Hunter concert poster can be seen on display at the Community Center in nearby Mineola, Iowa.

North Omaha's musical culture also birthed several nationally and internationally reputable African American musicians. Preston Love and drummer Buddy Miles were friends while growing up. They collaborated throughout their lives, and while they were playing with the greatest names in rock and roll, jazz, R&B, and funk. Big Joe Williams and funk band leader Lester Abrams are also from North Omaha. Omaha-born Wynonie Harris, one of the founders of rock and roll, got his start at the North Omaha clubs and for a time lived in the now-demolished Logan Fontennelle projects at 2213 Charles Street.

Surf
One of Omaha's most famous exports is the influential surf band The Chevrons, who were voted Omaha's most popular band in 1966.  Other 1960s bands include The Echos, 7 Legends, Velvet Haze, Little Denny Wonder, Freedom Road and The Beautiful People.

Other places

Fremont
The earliest rock and roll band from Fremont, Nebraska was The Nomads, followed by The Sneakers, The Fugitives, The Invaders , The Brakmen   and The Coachmen.  The long-running popular Haywood-Wakefield Band is maybe the region's most influential.  Doug Campbell from Lincoln, Little Joe & the Ramrods, The Smoke Ring, Don Sohl & the Roadrunners and Ron Thompson & the Broughams were also influential.

Lincoln
Being a university town, Lincoln has had a thriving music scene since the 1950s.  Lincoln's Zager and Evans hit #1 on the Billboard Hot 100 chart for six weeks with their song In the Year 2525 from 1969. Zager and Evans met at Nebraska Wesleyan University. Starting in the late 1970s, with the coming of the punk movement there has been and remains an explosion in rock bands on the Lincoln scene. In the late 1980s and throughout the 1990s, many notable bands like 13 Nightmares, Leafy Green Things, The Gladstones, The New Brass Guns, For Against, The Millions, Charlie Burton, Sideshow, 2 Below, Matthew Sweet and Mercy Rule came from Lincoln.  Current notable artists The Brigandines, The JV All*Stars, An Hobbes  Stonebelly, BlackDoubt, Ideal Cleaners, Straight Outta Junior High, Nick Hardt, Brimstone Howl, The Awkwords, Josh Hoyer & Soul Colossal, and Eagle*Seagull. Indie record labels that originated in Lincoln include Wild Records, Caulfield Records and -ismist Recordings. The brothers A.J. Mogis and Mike Mogis also own Presto! Recording Studios which is located in Lincoln.

The Zoo Bar in Lincoln, styled around the Chicago blues clubs, brought in many popular artists from Chicago in the 1970s such as Magic Slim, Bo Diddley and Robert Cray. The venue celebrated its 40th anniversary in 2013.

North Platte
The Cedar Room voted as the No.1 Steakhouse in the US by Travelawaits.com has been open since 2017 and brings in talented artists from all across Nebraska such as The Innocence, Strings Attached and The Platinum Pearls supporting live music.

See also
Arapaho music
Culture of Omaha, Nebraska
Indigenous music of North America#Plains

Notes

References
 Blush, Steven (2001). American Hardcore: A Tribal History. Los Angeles, CA: Feral House. .

External links
Starcityscene.com: Online zine covering the Lincoln music scene.
1% Productions
Lazy-i: Online indie music 'zine/blog with a special emphasis on the Omaha area.
SLAM Omaha
Knickerbockers - venue in Lincoln, Nebraska
The Bourbon Theatre - venue in Lincoln, Nebraska

 
Nebraska
Nebraska culture